Alphaville is a German synth-pop band formed in Münster in 1982. They gained popularity in the 1980s. The group was founded by singers Marian Gold, Bernhard Lloyd, and Frank Mertens. They achieved chart success with the singles "Forever Young", "Big in Japan", "Sounds Like a Melody", "The Jet Set" and "Dance with Me". Gold remains the only continuous member of Alphaville.

History

Formation
Alphaville was formed after lead singer Marian Gold and Bernhard Lloyd met in Berlin in 1981. The pair were heavily influenced by UK indie acts like Tubeway Army, Gary Numan and Orchestral Manoeuvres in the Dark (OMD). Gold had written "Big in Japan" in 1979 after hearing the music of Holly Johnson's band Big in Japan. They first named their band "Forever Young" and subsequently changed it to "Alphaville" after the 1965 science fiction film. Together the three wrote Forever Young and recorded their first demo of the same name. The first Alphaville concert took place on 31 December, 1982 in Enger, Westphalia. In 1984, the newly renamed Alphaville released their debut single, "Big in Japan". In the early years, Gold said that "none of us could really play an instrument. The music was in our heads, but we were dependent on synthesizers and drum machines and things like that. ... The equipment we had at that time was basically toys – the cheapest monophonic synthesizers you could imagine. We had a little studio in a basement, made a couple of demos and sent them to some record companies to try to get a deal. We didn’t have much hope, but we had three offers and from that moment everything happened very fast."

Forever Young (1984)

In autumn 1984, they released their debut album, Forever Young, produced by Colin Pearson, Wolfgang Loos and Andreas Budde.

"Big in Japan" topped the charts in Germany, Greece, Switzerland, Sweden, Turkey, Venezuela, and the US Billboard Dance Chart (the group's only Top 10 on any Billboard chart). The single also reached the Top Five in the Netherlands, Norway, Austria, Ireland and South Africa. It became the group's only Top 20 single in the UK, peaking at No. 8.

The band's next two singles, "Sounds Like a Melody" and "Forever Young", were also both European Top 5 successes, although the former track failed to make an impression on the American charts. The song "Forever Young" was written during the Cold War, where the singer said "hoping for the best, but expecting the worst; are you gonna drop the bomb or not?"

Amid reports that pop star Laura Branigan was featuring the song on her next album, Hold Me, Alphaville's "Forever Young" was re-released as a single in the US. The Alphaville version was released a third time in the US in 1988, to promote Alphaville: The Singles Collection, and peaked at No. 65, their highest charting (and also last) single on the Billboard Hot 100.

Despite the success of the album and its singles, the band did not tour. Said Gold, "we didn't feel we were good enough musicians [to tour]. These days it wouldn't be a problem to go out and play with tracks, but at that time it was really complicated. We didn't feel like we were performers. We felt more like we were studio rats. The studio felt like a safe environment. So, much to the annoyance of our manager, we didn't play [live] very much."

Despite their commercial success in the United Kingdom in the 1980s, Alphaville has never performed live in the UK.
Soon after the success of the album, Mertens left the band in December. He was replaced in January 1985 by Marian's old friend Ricky Echolette on keyboard and guitar.

Afternoons in Utopia (1986) 

In 1986, their second album, Afternoons in Utopia, was released and its first single "Dance With Me" was a Top 20 hit in Germany, France, Norway, Sweden, Switzerland, South Africa and in remix form on the US Hot Maxi Singles chart. It reached the Top 30 in Austria, Italy and in the US Club Play chart. The album's second single was "Universal Daddy". For their third single, the band released "Jerusalem" in Germany only, while they went with "Sensations" for Austria, France, the Netherlands, and Switzerland. The final single from Afternoons in Utopia was "Red Rose", in 1987.

The Breathtaking Blue (1989)

Their third album in 1989, The Breathtaking Blue, included the singles "Romeos" and "Mysteries of Love" and was released as a CD+G, including black & white stills with original lyrics and German translation. As an alternative to individual music videos, the band enlisted nine directors, among them Godfrey Reggio (Koyaanisqatsi), to create a film entitled Songlines based on the album's tracks.

Prostitute (1994) 

The next album, Prostitute, was not released until 1994. The first single released was "Fools", followed by the second and last single from the album, "The Impossible Dream". During the tour for this album Robbie France briefly joined the band on drums. In 1997, after the band went to record their next album, Echolette left the band because he decided to spend time with his family.

Salvation (1997) 

Salvation followed in 1997. A limited edition box-set, Dreamscapes, was issued in 1999. In 2000 Stark Naked and Absolutely Live was released. In 2001, the remix album Forever Pop and a DVD entitled Little America of two concerts performed in Salt Lake City, Utah. Bernhard Lloyd did not contribute to the second limited edition box-set, the 2003 CrazyShow, and shortly after its release on 18 March 2003, he officially left the group, But he stays in contact with Gold. The core stage members of Alphaville then were Gold and new recruits, Martin Lister (keyboards), David Goodes (guitars) and Jakob Kiersch (drums).

Catching Rays on Giant (2010)

On 19 November 2010 the album Catching Rays on Giant, the first commercial studio album in 13 years was released and entered the German album charts at number 9 in its first week. The touring musicians became members of the band at this point. The second single from the album was the track, "Song for No One", released on 4 March 2011. It is available in two formats, one as a 12-track CD and the other a deluxe edition with CD plus four bonus tracks and DVD. It is also available digitally from various download platforms. The DVD in the deluxe package includes the video to the first single and a documentary titled Audiovision, which is there in a normal version and also in a 3D version. The package contains 3D glasses. The band held an album release party, where they played a short unplugged set, at the Quasimodo Club in Berlin on the evening of 18 November 2010 to which their closest fans and friends were invited. The album featured band member Martin Lister on lead vocals for the track, "Call Me Down". In 2011 Maja Kim joined the band on bass.

The first single and album releases were available at first only in Germany and through online shops and download platforms in German-speaking countries. The first single from album was titled "I Die for You Today", available as a digital download on 8 October 2010, released in CD format on 22 October 2010. It entered the German charts at number 15 in its first week of release and stayed in the top 100 for 8 weeks. Invited by the designer Michael Michalsky, Alphaville performed songs from the new album as well as old hits at the StyleNite on 21 January 2011 during Berlin Fashion Week. In March 2011 Alphaville toured the album across Germany and had signed a new deal with the Universal Music Group.

On 21 May 2014, Martin Lister died unexpectedly, announced by the band via their Facebook page and Yahoo mailing list, a few days later. He was replaced by Carsten Brocker. In 2016, bassist Maja Kim left in order to follow new challenges following the position was filled by Alexandra Merl.

Strange Attractor (2017)

Strange Attractor was released on 7 April 2017 after an extremely long production time, with a video for the single "Heartbreak City". In August 2017, they performed a Concert Tour in Houston, New York City, Chicago, and San Jose and Burbank, California.

2018–present: Collaboration and Eternally Yours
For the 35th anniversary of the group in 2018, Alphaville held a concert on 25 and 26 May at the Whisky A Go-Go club in Los Angeles, California. In 2019, the LA Concert Group issued a limited box set recording of this show containing five CDs, two DVDs and two Blu-ray discs.

In 2021, Alphaville teamed up with Schiller and released a new version of "Summer in Berlin" as Schiller x Alphaville.

On 7 February 2022, Gold announced a symphonic album of Alphaville songs to be released by the end of 2022, supported by the release of three singles over the course of the year. "Big in Japan" was released on 29 April as the first song from the album. On 11 June, "Sounds Like a Melody" was released as the second song from the album, now titled Eternally Yours. "Dance With Me" was revealed to be the third song on 27 July, as part of a podcast presented by Gold and his daughter Lily Becker. Eternally Yours released on 23 September 2022, containing new symphonic versions of sixteen Alphaville songs, plus a new song also titled "Eternally Yours."

Projects
Gold has released two solo albums (So Long Celeste, 1992, and United, 1996, both mixing personal creations and covers), alongside his work in the band.

Lloyd also worked on a project named Atlantic Popes with singer Max Holler, releasing a 13-track CD.

On 25–26 May 2018, Alphaville and Marian Gold played two nights at the Whisky a Go Go club in Hollywood. The two concerts were also live streamed.

On 15 March 2019, the album "Forever Young" was remastered for the 35th anniversary.

On 7 May 2021, the albums "Afternoons in Utopia" and "The Breathtaking Blue" was remastered after the successful reissue of the album Forever Young.

To support the upcoming release of the symphonic album Eternally Yours in 2022, Gold and his daughter Lily Becker began a podcast discussing Alphaville songs and the album.

Legacy

Alphaville's song "Forever Young" was featured in the movie Listen to Me (1989) featuring Kirk Cameron in one of his first film roles. "Forever Young" was played in a high school prom-related scene in the 2004 film Napoleon Dynamite. "Forever Young" was also featured in the Canadian movie 1987 (2014).

Swedish melodic metal band Embraced did a cover of "Big in Japan" on their 1998 Album Amorous Anathema. In 2000, Guano Apes covered "Big in Japan" in their second full-length album, Don't Give Me Names. In 2008, "Big in Japan" was featured in the commercial for the Swedish TV show Stor i Japan (Translated: Big in Japan) and was also used several times within the show, using different cover versions as the opening theme. VH1 Classic's show 120 Minutes often features the song.

In the first part of 2006, Australian guitar band Youth Group took their remake of "Forever Young" to No. 1 in the Official Australian Charts, thanks in part to exposure the track had received from being on popular US TV series The O.C. and its fifth TV soundtrack CD, Music from the OC: Mix 5.

"Young Forever" is the fourth single by American hip hop rapper Jay-Z from his album The Blueprint 3 on the Roc Nation label. The song was produced by rapper Kanye West. It is a mild rework of Alphaville's 1984 song "Forever Young": the original melody is retained, Mr Hudson sings the original lyrics (primarily during the chorus), and Jay-Z raps in place of the verses.

Despite their commercial success in the United Kingdom in the 1980s, Alphaville has never performed live in the UK.

Band members

Current members
Marian Gold - lead vocals (1982–present)
David Goodes - guitars (2003–present)
Jakob Kiersch - drums (2003–present)
Carsten Brocker - keyboards, drum programming (2014–present)
Alexandra Merl - bass guitar (2016–present)

Former members
Bernhard Lloyd - keyboards, guitars (1982–2003)
Frank Mertens - keyboards (1982–1984)
Ricky Echolette - keyboards, guitars (1985–1997)
Robbie France - drums (1993-1995; died 2012)
Rob Harris - guitars, backing vocals (1995-2003)
Shane Meehan - drums (1995-2003)
Martin Lister - keyboards, backing vocals (1995–2014; died 2014)
Maja Kim - bass guitar (2011–2016)

Timeline

Awards and nominations
{| class=wikitable
|-
! Year !! Awards !! Work !! Category !! Result
|-
| rowspan=3|1984
| Goldene Europa
| rowspan=2|Themselves
| Best Group
| 
|-
| rowspan=2|Rockbjörnen
| Best Foreign Group
| 
|-
| Forever Young
| Best Foreign Album
|

Discography

Studio albums
 Forever Young (1984)
 Afternoons in Utopia (1986)
 The Breathtaking Blue (1989)
 Prostitute (1994)
 Salvation (1997)
 Catching Rays on Giant (2010)
 Strange Attractor (2017)
 Eternally Yours (2022)

References

External links

 Alphaville Moonbase – Official Alphaville website
 featured Alphaville Moonbase (official) - YouTube – Official Alphaville YouTube channel
 featured Alphaville Moonbase (official) - Instagram – Official Alphaville Instagram account
 featured Alphaville Moonbase (official) - TikTok – Official Alphaville TikTok account
 featured Alphaville Moonbase (official) - Twitter – Official Alphaville Twitter account
 Alphaville now! – Archive-Link of the former official Alphaville weblog (the Domain is not active anymore)
 

Musical groups established in 1982
English-language singers from Germany
German synthpop groups
German new wave musical groups
1982 establishments in West Germany
Synth-pop new wave musical groups
Culture in Münster
Musical groups from North Rhine-Westphalia
Metropolis Records artists
Hansa Records artists
Polydor Records artists
Atlantic Records artists